Sheldon Lynn Neuse (born December 10, 1994) is an American professional baseball infielder for the Hanshin Tigers of Nippon Professional Baseball (NPB). He previously played in Major League Baseball (MLB) for the Los Angeles Dodgers and Oakland Athletics. He played college baseball for the Oklahoma Sooners.

Career

Amateur career
Neuse attended Fossil Ridge High School in Keller, Texas. The Texas Rangers selected him in the 38th round of the 2013 Major League Baseball (MLB) draft, but he did not sign. Neuse enrolled at the University of Oklahoma, where he played college baseball for the Oklahoma Sooners. In 2015, he played collegiate summer baseball with the Harwich Mariners of the Cape Cod Baseball League. As a junior at Oklahoma in 2016, Neuse hit .369/.465/.646 with 10 home runs and 48 runs batted in (RBIs). He won the Brooks Wallace Award, given annually to the best shortstop in college baseball.

Washington Nationals
The Washington Nationals selected Neuse in the second round of the 2016 MLB draft. He signed with the Nationals and made his professional debut with the Auburn Doubledays. He finished his first professional season with a .230 batting average and one home run. Neuse began 2017 with the Hagerstown Suns.

Oakland Athletics
On July 16, 2017, the Nationals traded Neuse to the Oakland Athletics, along with Jesús Luzardo and Blake Treinen, in exchange for Sean Doolittle and Ryan Madson. The Athletics assigned him to the Stockton Ports, and he was later promoted to the Midland RockHounds. In 117 total games between Hagerstown, Stockton, and Midland, he posted a .321 batting average, 16 home runs, 79 RBIs, and an .884 OPS. The Athletics assigned Neuse to the Mesa Solar Sox of the Arizona Fall League after the regular season. He played in 22 games for the Solar Sox, posting a .314 batting average along with five home runs and 23 RBIs.

In 2018, Neuse played for the Nashville Sounds where he slashed .263/.304/.357 with five home runs and 55 RBIs in 135 games. He opened the 2019 season with the Las Vegas Aviators, hitting .317/.389/.550/.939 with 27 home runs and 102 RBI.

On August 29, 2019, the Athletics selected Neuse's contract and promoted him to the major leagues. He made his major league debut on August 30 versus the New York Yankees, going 0-for-3 with a walk. Two days later Neuse notched his first hit, a two-run double down the right field line off of Ryan Dull of the Yankees. he appeared in 25 games for the Athletics, hitting .250. He did not play in 2020 as a result of the cancellation of the minor league season because of the COVID-19 pandemic, but he spent the season working out at the Athletics alternate training site as part of their 60-man player pool.

Los Angeles Dodgers
On February 12, 2021, the Athletics traded Neuse and Gus Varland to the Los Angeles Dodgers in exchange for Adam Kolarek and Cody Thomas. On April 22, 2021, Neuse hit his first big league home run off of Emilio Pagán of the San Diego Padres. He played in 33 games for Los Angeles, hitting .182 with three home runs and 4 RBI. He spent most of the season with the Triple-A Oklahoma City Dodgers, where he hit .293 with 13 home runs and 56 RBI in 78 games. He was designated for assignment by the Dodgers on December 1, 2021.

Oakland Athletics (second stint)
Neuse was claimed off waivers by the Oakland Athletics on March 16, 2022. On April 11, Neuse hit his first career grand slam off of Tampa Bay Rays outfielder Brett Phillips as part of a 3-for-5 day. On September 24, Neuse was designated for assignment. He elected free agency on November 10, 2022.

Hanshin Tigers
On November 19, 2022, Neuse signed with the Hanshin Tigers of Nippon Professional Baseball.

Personal life
Neuse's brother, Dylan, also played baseball at Fossil Ridge and was drafted by the Minnesota Twins in the 17th round of the 2021 MLB draft.

Neuse and his wife Kadence welcomed their first child, a son, in October 2018.

References

External links

Oklahoma Sooners bio

1994 births
Living people
Baseball players from Fort Worth, Texas
Major League Baseball infielders
Oakland Athletics players
Los Angeles Dodgers players
Oklahoma Sooners baseball players
Harwich Mariners players
Auburn Doubledays players
Hagerstown Suns players
Stockton Ports players
Midland RockHounds players
Mesa Solar Sox players
Nashville Sounds players
Las Vegas Aviators players
Oklahoma City Dodgers players